Analia Saban (born 1980) is a contemporary conceptual artist that was born in Buenos Aires, Argentina, but is currently living in Los Angeles, California. Her work takes traditional artistic media such as drawing, painting and sculpture and pushes their limits as a scientific experimentation with art making. Because of her pushing the limits with different forms of art, Saban has taken the line that separated the different art forms and merged them together.

Biography 
Analia Saban was born and grew up in Buenos Aires, Argentina. She earned her B.F.A in Visual Arts from Loyola University New Orleans in the year of 2001 and her M.F.A. in New Genres from UCLA in 2005. She studied under the artist John Baldessari and was a Research Institute Artist in Residency at the Getty Museum, Los Angeles, from 2015 to 2016. She currently resides and works in the city of Los Angeles in the United States.  Her artwork is featured in many art museums across the country as well as around the world.

Work
Saban often works with materials in ways that confuse or subvert their typical meaning or use in studio art practice. She describes her method of working as artistic, scientific, and archaeological, due to her awareness of the larger social implications of her material and object-based inquiries. Of her work, Saban has said "I like to work as unconsciously as I can, letting ideas take over my production. I try to avoid “forcing” the creative process. I try to keep a constant level of experimentation, but sometimes I also have to sit, look at previous work, or experiments, or the empty wall, and wait.." She seeks to redefine the traditional notions of painting by utilizing the medium of paint as the subject of her work often using historical art references and traditions.

Some of Saban's more well known projects have involved completely unraveling a painted canvas and re-weaving the threads into scarves or rolling them into a "Painting Ball," bending slabs of marble or concrete and draping them over sawhorses, and printing plastic bags out of hand-made cotton paper. She continues to explore different art-making processes and materials in relation to her daily experience, by using methods such as unweaving paintings, laser-burning wood and canvas, molding forms in acrylic paint, and weaving paint through linen thread.

She is the winner of the Norton Museum's 2012 "Rudin Prize For Emerging Photographers".

Saban's work has been exhibited widely both nationally and internationally and are represented in the collections of the Getty Research Institute, in Los Angeles; Blaffer Art Museum and The Museum of Fine Arts in Houston; San Antonio Museum of Art in San Antonio; Mead Art Museum in Amherst; Albright-Knox Art Gallery and Hessel Museum of Art at Bard College in New York; The Israel Museum in Jerusalem; National Gallery of Victoria in Melbourne;  Hammer Museum at UCLA, Museum of Contemporary Art, and Los Angeles County Museum of Art in Los Angeles; Hessel Museum of Art at Bard College in New York; Norton Museum of Art in Florida; Centre Pompidou in Paris, and Fundación Proa in Buenos Aires, Allen Memorial Art Museum of Oberlin College, among others.

Solo exhibitions
2005: Bit by Bit, Kim Light Gallery / LightBox Gallery (Inaugural Exhibition), Los Angeles, CA
2007: Wet Paintings in the Womb, Galerie Sprüth Magers Projekte, Munich, Germany
2007: When things collapse, Praz-Delavallade, Paris, France
2009: Living Color, Praz-Delavallade, Paris, France
2009: Light Breaks Out of Prism, Thomas Solomon Gallery, Los Angeles, CA
2010: Information Leaks, Josh Lilley Gallery, London
2010: Froing and Toing, Light and Wire Gallery, Los Angeles, CA
2011: Grayscale, Thomas Solomon Gallery, Los Angeles, CA
2011: Dig, Praz-Delavallade, Paris, France
2011: Derrames, 11x7 Galeria, Buenos Aires
2012: Gag, Tanya Bonakdar Gallery, New York
2013: Datum, Josh Lilley Gallery, London
2013: Bathroom Sink, etc., Sprüth Magers, Berlin
2014: Outburst, Galerie Praz-Delavallade, Paris, France
2015: Backyard, Tanya Bonakdar Gallery, New York
2015: Interiors, Galerie Sprüth Magers, London
2016: Paper or Plastic, Mixografia, Los Angeles, CA
2016: Analia Saban, Blaffer Art Museum, University of Houston, Houston, TX
2016: Analia Saban Is Broken, Gemini G.E.L., Los Angeles, CA
2017: The Warp and Woof of Painting, Galerie Praz-Delavallade, Paris, France
2017: Folds and Faults, Galerie Sprüth Magers, Los Angeles, CA
2017: Pigmente, Galerie Sprüth Magers, Berlin, Germany
2017: Canvas on Paint, Qiao Space, Shanghai
2017: Where We Start From, Gemini G.E.L., Los Angeles, CA
2018: Punched Card, Tanya Bonakdar Gallery, New York
2019: FOCUS: Analia Saban, Modern Art Museum of Fort Worth, Texas
2019: Particle Theory Arario Gallery, Seoul, South Korea
2019: Analia Saban: Dry Clean Only, Mixografia, Los Angeles
2021: Save As, Galerie Sprüth Magers, Berlin, Germany
2022: Quantifiable, Galerie Praz-Delavallade, Paris, France
In 2014, Saban participated in a group exhibition at the National Museum of Norway in Oslo.

Other Exhibitions 
2011: Painting Expanded, Tanya Bonakdar Gallery, New York 
2012: Hammer Biennial: Made in LA, Hammer Museum, Los Angeles 
2012: Analia Saban: Gag, Tanya Bonakdar Gallery, New York 
2014: Between the Lines, Tanya Bonakdar Gallery, New York 
2014: ADAA Art Show, Park Avenue Armory, New York 
2015: Analia Saban: Backyard, Tanya Bonakdar Gallery, New York 
2017: Analia Saban, Blaffer Art Museum, University of Houston 
2018: Analia Saban: Punched Card, Tanya Bonakdar Gallery, New York 
2019: Analia Saban: Focus, Modern Art Museum of Forth Worth, TX 
2020: Songs in the Dark, Tanya Bonakdar Gallery, New York 
2020: The Return of the Real, Tanya Bonakdar Gallery, New York 
2020: Restless Index, Curated by Kelly Akashi and Cayetano Ferrer, Tanya Bonakdar Gallery, Los Angeles 
2021: Analia Saban: View Count, Tanya Bonakdar Gallery, New York 
2021: IRL, Tanya Bonakdar Gallery, New York

Lectures and Panel Discussions 

 2021: Artist's Choice: Analia Saban and Bill Fox in Conversation, June 10th, The Clark, MA (virtual event)

 2021: OnWeaving Final Review Committee, May 7th, UPENN, PE (virtual event)

 2021: Art + Materiality: Analia Saban, Andrea Chung, Alex Olson, moderated by Lindsay Preston Zappas, May 6th, Venice Family Clinic, CA (virtual event)

 2021: OnWeaving Final Review Committee, April 22nd, SCI-Arc, Los Angeles, CA (virtual event)
 2021: Analia Saban in Conversation with Jo Applin and Pia Gottschaller, March 5th, The Courtauld, London (virtual event)
 2020: Thesis Reviews, Spring / Fall, SCI-Arc, Los Angeles, CA 
 2019: Artist Lecture, The Modern Art Museum, March 26th, Fort Worth, TX 
 2019: Artists on Art Lecture, Study Center for Photography and Works on Paper, LACMA, February 23rd, Los Angeles, CA 
 2018: Vertical Studio Reviews, Prof. Florencia Pita, Sci-Arc, Spring Semester, Los Angeles, CA
 2018: UCI Claire Trevor School of the Arts, Visiting Artist, February 8th, Irvine, CA
 2017: CSU Bakersfield, Art Department Visiting Artist, October 25th, Bakersfield, CA
 2017: CSU Long Beach, Art Department Visiting Artist Lecture, October 10th, Long Beach, CA
 2017: Analia Saban and Selene Preciado in Conversation, October 5th, Art + Practice, Los Angeles, CA
 2017: University of Nevada, Las Vegas - Art Department Visiting Artist, September 7th, Las Vegas, NV
 2017: Artists on Artists: Analia Saban on Anna Maria Maiolino, August 13th, Musem of Contemporary Art, Los Angeles, CA 
 2017: The Histories and Uses of Materials: Nina Beier, Analia Saban, and Kaari Upson with respondent Ruba Katrib, Curated by Alex Bacon. Helen Frankenthaler Foundation, April 26th, New York, NY
 2017: Urban Ecology and Archeology in Contemporary Art Practice: Mark Hagen, Analia Saban, and Anna Sew Hoy, LACMA, March 20th, Los Angeles, CA
 2016: University of Houston, Graduate Art Department Visiting Artist, November 3rd, Houston, TX
 2016: Artists in Conversation: NO MAN'S LAND, National Museum of Women in the Arts, November 11th, Washington, DC 
 2016: Gallery Talk: Analia Saban. Blaffer Museum, September 23rd, 2016, University of Houston, TX
 2016: LA Print Edition 6: Lecture with Analia Saban. LACMA, March 15th, Los Angeles, CA

References

External links 
The New York Times - "An Artist at Home on the Fault Lines" by Jori Finkel

1980 births
Living people
21st-century Argentine women artists
Artists from Buenos Aires
Artists from Los Angeles
University of California, Los Angeles alumni
Loyola University New Orleans alumni
Argentine expatriates in the United States